San Esteban is a municipality in the northeast of the Honduran department of Olancho, west of Dulce Nombre de Culmí, east of Gualaco and north of Catacamas. Costa Rican author Oscar Núñez Oliva set his 2000 novel Los Gallos de San Esteban in the municipality.

History
The municipality was named in honor of friar Esteban Verdelete, a missionary who collaborated in the evangelism of the people of the region.

It was founded in 1808 by friar José Antonio Liendo y Goicoechea from Guatemala. It was populated by indigenous people at that time.

Geography
The municipality is bordered to the north by the municipalities of Trujillo and Iriona, South by the municipality of Catacamas, East by the municipality of Dulce Nombre de Culmí and West by the municipality of Gualaco. It stretches from the top the Agalta valley and crossed by the Grande Agalta river.

Villages 
The municipality has the following 22 villages:
 San Esteban
 Agua Blanca
 Carnizuelar
 Conquire
 Coronado
 Corral Viejo
 El Aguacate
 El Ciruelo
 El Limonal
 El Ocote
 El Quebrachal
 El Tunal
 La Concepción
 Las Manzanas
 Las Trojas
 Moreno
 Río Abajo
 San Agustín Abajo
 San Martín
 Santa María
 Santa María del Carbón
 Toro Muerto

Demographics
At the time of the 2013 Honduras census, San Esteban municipality had a population of 25,572. Of these, 90.33% were Mestizo, 6.11% Indigenous (5.84% Pech), 2.79% White,  0.36% Black or Afro-Honduran and 0.41% others.

References

Municipalities of the Olancho Department